Caladenia pilotensis is a plant in the orchid family Orchidaceae and is endemic to Victoria. It is a ground orchid with a single leaf and one or two white or creamy-white flowers which sometimes have red lines. It is only known to occur on a single mountain.

Description
The sepals and petals have brown or reddish glandular tips. Flowering occurs in September and October.

Taxonomy and naming
Caladenia pilotensis was first formally described in 1999 by David Jones and the description was published in The Orchadian.

Distribution and habitat
Caladenia pilotensis is only known from Mount Pilot near Beechworth where it grows in woodland, often between granite boulders.

Conservation
Caladenia pilotensis  is listed as "endangered" under the Victorian Flora and Fauna Guarantee Act 1988.

References 

pilotensis
Plants described in 1999
Endemic orchids of Australia
Orchids of Victoria (Australia)
Taxa named by David L. Jones (botanist)